CoRoT-10b is a transiting exoplanet found by the CoRoT space telescope in 2010.

It is an Jupiter-sized planet orbiting K1V star with Te = 5075K, M = 0.89M☉, R = 0.79R☉, above solar metallicity. It has an estimated age below 3.0 Gyr.

References

Hot Jupiters
Transiting exoplanets
Exoplanets discovered in 2010
10b
Aquila (constellation)